The US Southwest Soaring Museum is an aviation museum, located at 918 E US Route 66, in Moriarty, New Mexico, United States that focuses on the history of gliding in the western United States. The museum is an affiliate member of the Soaring Society of America.

Mission
The museum has the following aims: preserving and presenting the history and legacy of soaring; promoting an increased understanding of mathematics and the physical sciences through educational exhibits and programs; sponsoring aeronautical research programs relating to solar-powered flight; communicating an inspirational story of innovation and discovery for the New Mexico schoolchildren, the citizens of NM and visitors passing through the state and motivating others to experience the wonder of flight

History
The museum was conceived in 1995 and opened in 1996 at the Moriarty, New Mexico airport. In 2006 the museum moved to its current location of 918 Historic US Route 66 East in Moriarty, New Mexico. Founding president George Applebay and a ten-person volunteer board of directors spent ten years assembling the collection of more than 50 gliders and models and finding a location for the museum.

Collection
The museum has an extensive collection of gliders, including:

See also
List of aerospace museums
List of gliders

References

External links

Aerospace museums in New Mexico
Museums in Torrance County, New Mexico